Akwanga is a Local Government Area in Nasarawa State, Nigeria. Its headquarters are in the town of Akwanga.

It has an area of 996 km and a population of 513,930 at the 2006 census.
The postal code of the area is 960.

Languages
Akwanga is predominantly occupied by the Mada language speaking people, however, [Plateau languages] are spoken in and around Akwanga. Plateau language groups surrounding Akwanga town, listed clockwise, are Koro, Hyamic, Ndunic, Alumic, Ninzic, Eggonic, and Jilic.

Education
Akwanga is considered the center of education in Nasarawa state for its wide array of primary, secondary, and tertiary institutions. Akwanga is home to a famous and well known missionary school like Rishama Comprehensive College, Mada Hills Secondary School, the prestigious Shepherd's International College, Hope Academy Secondary School, Summit Children Academy/Isachar High School, ShanPePe Destiny International Schools, Destiny Kids Academy, Bright Model Academy, Akwanga south Primary school, the private co-educational, Christian boarding school; College of Education; Hills College of Education; NACABS Polytechnic; and School of Health, amongst many others. Akwanga has the highest number of schools in Nasarawa State.

References

Local Government Areas in Nasarawa State